Elections to Epping Forest Council were held on 10 June 2004.  One third of the council was up for election and the council stayed under no overall control. Overall turnout was 37.6%.

This election saw the British National Party first enter the council chamber. They would go on to double their representation. This also saw the largest loss of Labour seats since they were the council's largest party in 1998.

Results

Buckhurst Hill East

Buckhurst Hill West

Chigwell Row

Chigwell Village

Epping Hemnall

Epping Lindsey and Thornwood Common

Grange Hill

High Ongar, Willingale and The Rodings

Loughton Alderton

Loughton Broadway

Loughton Fairmead

Loughton Forest

Loughton Roding

Loughton St. John's

Loughton St. Mary's

Moreton and Fyfield

Passingford

Theydon Bois

Waltham Abbey Honey Lane

Waltham Abbey North East

Waltham Abbey South West

References
 2004 Epping Forest election result
 Epping Forest District Council: 2004 election: Ward Results archived from the original. (Retrieved 9 November 2013) 

2004
2004 English local elections
2000s in Essex